Argentina competed at the 1988 Summer Paralympics in Seoul, South Korea. 35 competitors from Argentina won 9 medals including 7 silver and 2 bronze medals and finished 39th in the medal table.

See also 
 Argentina at the Paralympics
 Argentina at the 1988 Summer Olympics

References 

Nations at the 1988 Summer Paralympics
1988
Summer Paralympics